Nicole Kim Uysiuseng-del Prado (born August 18, 1990), is a former Filipino actress, model, and was the second runner-up of the reality television show Pinoy Big Brother: Teen Edition Plus. She was also a member of ABS-CBN's Star Magic. 

Taking a break from her career to finish her education, she got in to Ateneo de Manila University and graduated with a course in B.A. Interdisciplinary Studies. 

She has now quit the showbiz scene and is married to Silas del Prado; the father of her child, Nadia del Prado.

Career
After her stint in PBB, Nicole joined the cast of the Philippine remake of My Girl with Robi Domingo and Josef Elizalde. After My Girl, she was given a regular show on ABS-CBN via Precious Hearts Romances present: Bud Brothers and Somewhere In My Heart.

Filmography

Television

Movies

Awards and nominations

References

Ateneo de Manila University alumni
1990 births
Living people
Filipino child actresses
Filipino television actresses
Filipino people of Chinese descent
People from Quezon City
People from Cebu City
Actresses from Cebu
Pinoy Big Brother contestants
Star Magic